Allahabad (official name Prayagraj)), a city in the State of Uttar Pradesh, India is an important tourist destination attracting many tourists annually. Enriched with a glorious history and being one of the oldest cities in the world, Prayagraj has several historical monuments from different periods of Indian History, from the tomb of Khusru, in Khusrobagh which was built during the medieval period under Mughal Rule to All Saints Cathedral in Civil Lines built during the British Raj to Alopi Devi Mandir in Alopibagh which is one of the oldest Hindu temples built during the ancient period. Several more historical locations like the Allahabad Fort built by Emperor Akbar during the Mughal Rule to several ancient Hindu temples like the Hanuman Temple near Sangam adorn the city. Prayagraj is also famous worldwide for the Kumbh Mela, a holy religious gathering of Hindu pilgrims which also attracts many tourists and has been taking place in the city from ancient times. There are several other places of interest like the Allahabad University which was built by the British during the British Raj to several contemporary monuments, each depicting a different time-period in the history of the city.



List

References

 
Tourism
Allahabad
Allahabad
category lists of Allahabad City Tourist Places